Amungula Parish is a parish of Murray County, New South Wales, a cadastral unit for use on land titles. It is located in two non-contiguous sections, divided by the Australian Capital Territory, as most of the parish was transferred to the ACT in 1909 and now makes up much of the Kowen district. Before 1909, the Molonglo River was the southern boundary of the parish. The Kings Highway passes through a small part of the southern remaining portion. It was formerly located in Yarrowlumla Shire, but is now located in Queanbeyan-Palerang Regional Council.

See also 
 Land District of Queanbeyan

References

External links 
 
 

Parishes of Murray County